Cynology  (rarely kynology) is the study of matters related to canines or domestic dogs. 
In English, it is a term sometimes used to denote a serious zoological approach to the study of dogs as well as by writers on canine subjects, dog breeders, trainers and enthusiasts who study the dog informally.

Etymology 
The word is not found in major English dictionaries and it is not a recognized study in English-speaking countries.
Similar words are in other languages, such German and Dutch .   is also the source of the English word cynic, and is directly related to canine and hound.

Usage in English 
The suffix '-logy' in English words refers to a study, or an academic discipline, or field of scientific study.  English classical compound words of this type may confer an impression of scientific rigor on a non-scientific occupation or profession.

Usage in English of the word cynology is rare, and occasionally found in the names of dog training academies, with cynologist sometimes being used as a title by some dog trainers or handlers. People who informally study the dog may refer to themselves as 'cynologists' to imply serious study or scientific work.

The very rare term cynologist in English is generally found to refer to "canine specialists" such as; certified care professionals, certified show judges, breeders, breed enthusiasts, certified dog-trainers and professional dog-handlers.

Usage in other languages 
Cynology may have other connotations or uses in languages other than English; see German , Dutch  and Czech .

A similar word is used to refer to dog handlers and dog trainers in Russia.
A veterinary clinic in Armenia offers a 'cynologist' to assist with dog training.
A magazine in the Baltic states described as 'dedicated to the development of cynology in the Baltic countries' covers dog training, dog shows, and veterinary advice (a hobbyist magazine, not a scientific journal.)

References

External links

Further reading
 Suchanova, J. & Tovstucha, R.E., Problems in translating the names of dog breeds from the perspective of different nomination principles & linguistic relativity. Coactivity: Philology, Educology 2016, 24(2): 113–121 

Mammalogy
Dogs
Subfields of zoology